Mumviri is a dialect of the Nuristani Kamkata-vari language, spoken by perhaps 1,500 of the Mumo people of Afghanistan.  There are only slight differences to the Kata-vari, Mumviri has Kamviri phonetic features. The most used alternative name is Bashgali, which derive from Khowar.

Mumviri is spoken in the Mangul, Sasku and Gabalgrom in the Bashgal Valley.

References

Sources
 The Mumo. Retrieved July 10, 2006, from Richard F. Strand: Nuristan, Hidden Land of the Hindu-Kush .

External links
 Nuristan: Hidden Land of the Hindu Kush -Includes a lexicon of Kamviri and more information.

Languages of Afghanistan
Languages of Khyber Pakhtunkhwa
Nuristani languages